Saint Jerome in Penitence is a 1515 oil-on-canvas painting by Italian Renaissance artist Lorenzo Lotto, now in the Allentown Art Museum in Allentown, Pennsylvania. It is signed on the rock next to the saint.

It was produced early in the painter's time in Bergamo. It was commissioned by Domenico Tasso, count and apostolic knight, for his new house on Via Pignolo in the city. Lotto had met Tasso in Rome and it may have been Tasso who drew him to Bergamo. Carlo Ridolfi mentions it among the paintings "in Domenego Dal Cornello's house" in 1648. In the 18th century Tasso's descendants sold it off to help with their financial difficulties. It was later acquired by Samuel H. Kress, who gave it to its present owner in 1960.

See also
 Saint Jerome in Penitence (Lotto, Paris), c.1506, Louvre, Paris
 Saint Jerome in Penitence (Lotto, Rome) (c.1509). Museo nazionale di Castel Sant'Angelo, Rome

References

Culture of Allentown, Pennsylvania
1515 paintings
Lotto, Allentown
Paintings by Lorenzo Lotto
Paintings in Pennsylvania
Lions in art
Paintings of crucifixes